Dongtan is a station on the Suseo high-speed railway. and Dongtan Station can go to Busan, Daegu, and Gwangju by SRT.

This station is in the Yulhyeon Tunnel.

Station layout 
GTX-A will operate on unused platforms in 2024.

SRT platforms

References 

Railway stations opened in 2016